This page is a list of films that received the Platinum Film since its introduction in 2001 by the Netherlands Film Festival and the Netherlands Film Fund. In 2001 and 2002, films from the Netherlands received the award once they had sold 200,000 tickets. From 2003 to date, the Platinum Film is awarded to films from the Netherlands once they have sold 400,000 tickets. This page shows, for both audience criteria, which films received the Platinum Film and how soon they received it after their releases.

In the following tables, the 'year' column contains the years in which the films received the Platinum Film, the '#' column contains the number of the Platinum Film, the 'film title' column contains the titles of the receiving films, the 'film release' column contains the dates on which the films were first released in the cinemas, and the 'Platinum Film' column contains the days when the Netherlands Film Festival and the Netherlands Film Fund announced that the receiving films reached the audience criterion of the Platinum Film.

When a film also received a Diamond Film, this award is listed in the 'other' column. The Diamond Film is awarded for 1,000,000 sold tickets since 2007. This award can be awarded in the same year as the Platinum Film or in a later year.

2001–2002

2003–2008

References

External links
 Platina Film at the website of the Netherlands Film Festival
Golden and Platin Film Netherlands at the Internet Movie Database

Dutch film awards
Platinum
Film box office
Platinum Film